The 1974 Orkney Islands Council election, the first election to Orkney Islands Council, was held on 7 May 1974 as part of the wider 1974 Scottish regional elections.  Only independent candidates contested the election and eight seats were uncontested.

The newly elected Orkney Islands Council existed as a shadow authority until 1975, when it inherited sole authority for local government in Orkney from the Orkney County Council, Kirkwall Town Council and Stromness Town Council.

Results

Ward Results

References

Orkney
Orkney Islands Council elections